The Palmdale Transportation Center is a multi-modal transportation center featuring a Metrolink rail station, a local bus hub, and commuter bus hub in the city of Palmdale, California. The center was completely rebuilt in April 2005. It features a "clock tower plaza" which has an enclosed waiting room with concessions and vending, public telephone, restrooms, a bus pass sales office, and security service. The center has four partially enclosed shelters at the bus hub and six partially enclosed shelters for the rail platform. The center also has a large park and ride facility with 586 spaces.

Rail service

Bus services 
The center serves as a hub for the Antelope Valley Transit Authority, the city's local bus system as well as a hub for its commuter bus network to Los Angeles. The North County TRANSporter, route 790, allows Metrolink passengers on mid-day trains (that only go as far as Newhall station in the Santa Clarita Valley) to travel to Palmdale station.

Greyhound Bus and FlixBus also serve the station.

Antelope Valley Transit Authority:
Local: 1, 3, 7, 8, 51 
Commuter Express: 785, 786, 787, North County TRANSporter (790)
School: 97, 98

FlixBus
routes to Victorville, Barstow, Las Vegas, and Los Angeles.

Greyhound Lines
Route 554 – Palmdale/Los Angeles

Future connections 
A multi-modal high-speed rail station just south of the existing station is designated as a stop on the planned California High-Speed Rail line from San Francisco to Los Angeles. It is also proposed as a terminus of the planned Brightline West high-speed rail line to Las Vegas.

References

External links 

Metrolink stations in Los Angeles County, California
Transportation in Palmdale, California
Transit centers in the United States
Railway stations in the United States opened in 1994
Buildings and structures in Palmdale, California
Proposed California High-Speed Rail stations